Bassam Raouf born in 1968 is an Iraqi football coach and former player.

Honours

Club
Al-Tayaran
Iraqi Premier League: 1991–92
Iraq FA Cup: 1991–92
Al-Zawraa 
Iraqi Premier League: 1993–94
Iraq FA Cup: 1993–94

International
 Peace and Friendship Cup: 1989

Individual
1986 Best Young Footballer of League.

References

External links
Iraqi Football Players in Europe at rsssf.com

Iraqi footballers
1968 births
Living people
Al-Shorta SC players
Al-Naft SC players
Al-Quwa Al-Jawiya players
Al-Zawraa SC players
FC Sportul Studențesc București players
Assyriska FF players
Iraq international footballers
Association football midfielders
Iraqi expatriate footballers
Expatriate footballers in Romania
Expatriate footballers in Sweden
Iraqi football managers
Expatriate football managers in Sweden
Sportspeople from Baghdad